To Love Ru is an anime series based on the manga of the same title written by Saki Hasemi and illustrated by Kentaro Yabuki. Produced by Xebec and directed by Takao Kato, the anime aired in Japan between April 4 and September 26, 2008. While the anime uses characters and general themes from the original manga, a large majority of this season was anime-original and did not adapt much material from its source manga. Three original video animation (OVA) episodes produced by Xebec and directed by Takao Kato were shipped starting on April 3, 2009 with pre-ordered copies of the manga's 13th, 14th and 15th volumes. An additional three OVA episodes were released with the bundled version of the 16th, 17th and 18th volumes. The opening theme for the OVAs is "Yatte Koi Daisuki" and the ending theme is "Apple panic"; both songs are by Haruka Tomatsu and Sayuri Yahagi, the voice actresses of Lala Satalin Deviluke and Haruna Sairenji, respectively.

The anime is licensed in North America by Sentai Filmworks and distributed by Section23 Films. The complete DVD collection part one containing the first half-season was released on December 15, 2009 and part two containing the second half-season was released on February 16, 2010. Sentai released the series on Blu-ray on March 18, 2014.

A second season of the anime titled  was produced by Xebec and directed by Atsushi Ōtsuki. It aired for 12 episodes between October 6 and December 22, 2010 and would mark the beginning of the anime strictly adhering to the manga. The opening theme for the second season is "Loop-the-Loop" by Kotoko and the ending theme is "Baby Baby Love" by Tomatsu. Sentai Filmworks have also licensed the second season and released the complete series set on DVD on April 3, 2012; the Blu-ray set was released on May 27, 2014.

Six OVA episodes of To Love Ru Darkness, a sequel manga, were produced by Xebec and released with the limited editions of the manga's 5th, 6th, 8th, 9th, 12th, and 13th volumes on DVD on August 17, 2012, December 19, 2012, August 19, 2013, December 4, 2013, December 4, 2014, and April 3, 2015, respectively. A twelve-episode anime television series and third season overall was also produced by Xebec, directed by Atsushi Ōtsuki, and aired between October 6 and December 29, 2012. Sentai Filmworks released To Love Ru Darkness on DVD and Blu-ray in North America on July 15, 2014.

A second season of To Love Ru Darkness and fourth overall, titled To Love Ru Darkness 2nd aired in Japan between July 7 and October 29, 2015. The opening theme is "secret arms" by Ray while the ending theme is "Gardens" by Mami Kawada. Sentai Filmworks released To Love Ru Darkness 2nd on DVD and Blu-ray in North America on November 1, 2016. Three OVA episodes of To Love Ru Darkness 2nd were produced by Xebec between January 4 and December 2, 2016. A fourth OVA episode to commemorate the 10th anniversary of To Love Ru was released on November 2, 2017 with a book titled To Love Ru Chronicles.

Series overview

Episode list

Season 1 (2008)

Season 2: Motto (2010)

Season 3: Darkness (2012)

Season 4: Darkness 2nd (2015)

OVAs

To Love Ru (2009–10)
These OVAs take place before Motto To Love Ru.

To Love Ru Darkness (2012–15)
The To Love Ru Darkness OVAs takes place after Motto To Love Ru. The first OVA episode serves as the pilot for the Darkness series while the subsequent OVA episodes consist of side stories between To Love Ru Darkness and To Love Ru Darkness 2nd.

To Love Ru Darkness 2nd (2016–17)
The first three To Love Ru Darkness 2nd OVAs take place 2 days after To Love Ru Darkness 2nd. The fourth OVA adapts an omake chapter released after the end of the To Love Ru Darkness manga.

Notes

References

External links
 Official anime website 

To-Love Ru
Episodes